Cope Park is the second and final studio album by American post punk band Audio Learning Center. Musically, Cope Park, like Friendships Often Fade Away, peers over the shoulders of giants. Like any band in this new millennium, Audio Learning Center simultaneously showcases their varied influences while building on them, creating something new.
It is the band's last release before Audio Learning Center disbanded.

Track listing

Personnel

Audio Learning Center
Christopher E. Brady – Lead vocals, bass
Steven Birch – Guitar, backing vocals
Paul Johnson – Drums, percussion

Additional musicians
James Beaton – Fender rhodes, Hammond organ, piano
Charlie Campbell – Slide Guitar

Artwork
Sean Tejaratchi – Album Design

Production
Joe Chiccarelli – Producer, audio production, mixing
Tom Baker – Mastering
Neil Chapman – Assistant Engineer
Jonathon Fagan – Assistant Engineer
Sean Flora – Assistant Engineer

References

2004 albums
Audio Learning Center albums
Vagrant Records albums
Albums produced by Joe Chiccarelli